Dillenia is a genus of flowering plants in the family Dilleniaceae, native to tropical and subtropical regions of southern Asia, Australasia, and the Indian Ocean islands.

The genus is named after the German botanist Johann Jacob Dillenius, and consists of evergreen or semi-evergreen trees and shrubs.

Structure
The leaves are simple and spirally arranged. They are generally large, in the case of D. reticulata reaching 1.27 meters (4.2 feet) in length  and about 16 inches (41 centimeters) wide.
The flowers are solitary, or in terminal racemes, with five sepals and five petals, numerous stamens (up to 900 in the case of D. ovalifolia, and a cluster of five to 20 carpels; they are superficially similar in appearance to Magnolia flowers.

Species

 

Plants of the World Online currently includes:

 Dillenia alata (R.Br. ex DC.) Banks ex Martelli
 Dillenia albiflos (Ridl.) Hoogland
 Dillenia andamanica C.E.Parkinson
 Dillenia aurea Sm.
 Dillenia auriculata Martelli
 Dillenia beccariana Martelli
 Dillenia biflora (A.Gray) Guillaumin
 Dillenia blanchardii Pierre
 Dillenia bolsteri Merr.
 Dillenia borneensis Hoogland
 Dillenia bracteata Wight
 Dillenia castaneifolia (Miq.) Martelli ex T.Durand & B.D.Jacks.
 Dillenia celebica Hoogland
 Dillenia crenatifolia Hoogland ex Mabb.
 Dillenia cyclopensis Hoogland
 Dillenia diantha Hoogland
 Dillenia excelsa (Jack) Martelli ex Gilg.
 Dillenia fagifolia Hoogland
 Dillenia ferruginea (Baill.) Gilg
 Dillenia fischeri Merr.
 Dillenia grandifolia Wall. ex Hook.f. & Thomson
 Dillenia hookeri Pierre
 Dillenia indica L.
 Dillenia ingens B.L.Burtt
 Dillenia insignis (A.C.Sm.) Hoogland
 Dillenia insularum Hoogland
 Dillenia luzoniensis Merr.
 Dillenia mansonii (Gage) Hoogland
 Dillenia marsupialis Hoogland
 Dillenia megalantha Merr.
 Dillenia monantha Merr.
 Dillenia montana Diels
 Dillenia nalagi Hoogland
 Dillenia obovata (Blume) Hoogland
 Dillenia ochreata (Miq.) Teijsm. & Binn. ex Martelli
 Dillenia ovalifolia Hoogland
 Dillenia ovata Wall. ex Hook.f. & Thomson
 Dillenia papuana Martelli
 Dillenia parkinsonii Hoogland
 Dillenia parviflora Griff.
 Dillenia pentagyna Roxb.
 Dillenia philippinensis Rolfe
 Dillenia pteropoda (Miq.) Hoogland
 Dillenia pulchella (Jack) Gilg
 Dillenia quercifolia (C.T.White & W.D.Francis ex Lane-Poole) Hoogland
 Dillenia reifferscheidia Fern.-Vill.
 Dillenia reticulata King
 Dillenia retusa Thunb.
 Dillenia salomonensis (C.T.White) Hoogland
 Dillenia scabrella (D.Don) Roxb. ex Wall.
 Dillenia schlechteri Diels
 Dillenia serrata Thunb.
 Dillenia sibuyanensis (Elmer) Merr.
 Dillenia suffruticosa (Griff.) Martelli
 Dillenia sumatrana Miq.
 Dillenia talaudensis Hoogland
 Dillenia tetrapetala Joongku Lee, T.B.Tran & R.K.Choudhary
 Dillenia triquetra (Rottb.) Gilg
 Dillenia turbinata Finet & Gagnep.

References

 
Eudicot genera